The Caribbean Basin Trade Partnership Act (CBTPA) is a law adopted by the U.S. Government in October 2000 to delineate enhanced trade preferences and eligibility requirements for the 24 beneficiary countries of the Caribbean Basin region.

On October 2, President Clinton signed the Proclamation implementing the Caribbean Basin Trade Partnership Act (CBTPA – Title II of the Trade and Development Act of 2000). The Presidential Proclamation declares the 24 current beneficiary countries of the Caribbean Basin Initiative (CBI) to be "Beneficiary Countries" for purposes of the enhanced trade preferences made available under the CBTPA. In addition, the Proclamation modifies the Harmonized Tariff Schedule to reflect the new trade preferences. It also delegates to the Office of the United States Trade Representative the authority to publish (through a Federal Register notice) additional determinations regarding the compliance of CBTPA Beneficiary Countries with customs-related procedures established in the CBTPA.

Summary of Enhanced CBTPA Preferences

The CBTPA significantly expands preferential treatment for apparel made in the Caribbean Basin region. Duty- and quota-free treatment is provided for apparel made in the CBI from U.S. fabrics formed from U.S. yarns. Duty/quota-free treatment is also available for certain knit apparel made in CBTPA beneficiary countries from fabrics formed in the Caribbean Basin region, provided that U.S. yarns are used in forming the fabric. This "regional fabric" benefit for knit apparel is subject to an overall yearly limit, with a separate limit provided for T-shirts.

New duty/quota free treatment will also be available for apparel made in the CBI from fabrics determined to be in "short supply" in the United States, and for designated "hand-loomed, handmade, or folklore" articles.

In addition to these apparel preferences, the CBTPA provides NAFTA-equivalent tariff treatment for certain items previously excluded from duty-free treatment under the CBI program (e.g., footwear, canned tuna, petroleum products, watches and watch parts).

Beneficiary Country Designation

The CBTPA authorized the President to designate individual countries as being "Beneficiary Countries" in order to receive the enhanced trade benefits available under the Act. The twenty-four current beneficiaries of the Caribbean Basin Economic Recovery Act (CBERA) were potentially eligible to be declared CBTPA Beneficiary Countries. These countries are: Antigua and Barbuda, Aruba, Bahamas, Barbados, Belize, Costa Rica, Dominica, Dominican Republic, El Salvador, Grenada, Guatemala, Guyana, Haiti, Honduras, Jamaica, Montserrat, Netherlands Antilles, Nicaragua, Panama, Saint Kitts and Nevis, Saint Lucia, Saint Vincent and the Grenadines, Trinidad and Tobago, and British Virgin Islands. Through the Proclamation issued today, President Clinton designated all 24 countries as CBTPA Beneficiary Countries.

Eligibility Review Factors

In considering the eligibility of these countries for CBTPA Beneficiary Country status, the CBTPA required the President to take into account the existing eligibility criteria of the CBERA, as well as several new criteria elaborated in the CBTPA. These new criteria include:

 Whether the beneficiary country has demonstrated a commitment to undertake its obligations under the WTO on or ahead of schedule and participate in negotiations toward the completion of the FTAA or another free trade agreement.
 The extent to which the country provides protection of intellectual property rights consistent with or greater than the protection afforded under the Agreement on Trade-Related Aspects of Intellectual Property Rights.
 The extent to which the country provides internationally recognized worker's rights, including:
 the right of association;
 the right to organize and bargain collectively;
 a prohibition on the use of any form of forced or compulsory labor;
 a minimum age for the employment of children; and
 acceptable conditions of work with respect to minimum wages, hours of work, and occupational safety and health;
 Whether the country has implemented its commitments to eliminate the worst forms of child labor.
 The extent to which the country has met U.S. counter-narcotics certification criteria under the Foreign Assistance Act of 1961.
 The extent to which the country has taken steps to become a party to and implements the Inter-American Convention Against Corruption.
 The extent to which the country applied transparent, nondiscriminatory and competitive procedures in government procurement, and contribute to efforts in international for to develop an implement rules on transparency in government procurement.

Customs-Related Eligibility Determination

In addition to Presidential eligibility designations based on the criteria described above, the CBTPA requires an additional determination that countries have implemented or are making substantial progress towards implementing certain customs procedures based on those contained in the NAFTA. Today's Proclamation delegates authority for these additional determinations to USTR. USTR will publish initial determinations on this eligibility criteria in coming days, through a notice in the Federal Register.

Eligibility Review Process

The USTR-chaired Trade Policy Staff Committee (TPSC) conducted a review of countries' eligibility for CBTPA preferences, taking into account the criteria established in the Act. This review relied upon information provided by U.S. Embassies, keyed to the various eligibility criteria, as well as on information from other reliable sources, such as the International Labour Organization. In addition, the TPSC took into account public comments regarding the eligibility review, solicited through a Federal Register notice published June 19, 2000. The TPSC received 206 comments in response to this notice.

Through a series of meetings, the TPSC identified a number of concerns regarding certain countries' performance with respect to the eligibility criteria established in the CBTPA. For each of these areas of concern, the TPSC further identified specific policy objectives to be pursued with the relevant governments, with the general aim of soliciting assurances that these concerns would be addressed. For those countries for which concerns and objectives had been identified, U.S. Embassy officials in the Caribbean Basin region and other U.S. government officials conducted intensive advocacy with local government officials. TPSC recommendations to the President regarding the designation of CBTPA Beneficiary Countries were based on the results
of these efforts.

The eligibility review process involved direct, issue-specific advocacy with a majority of the countries that were potentially eligible for CBTPA benefits. Objectives with respect to intellectual property protection, worker rights, implementation of WTO agreements, and commitments to abide by international anti-corruption guidelines were pursued with a range of countries. The review concluded that CBI countries satisfied the CBTPA criteria regarding commitments to eliminate the worst forms of child labor; however, several countries were urged to expand upon their current efforts to combat all forms of child labor.

Guatemala: Additional Review of Worker Rights Issues

The review of Guatemala's eligibility for the enhanced CBI preferences involved extensive consideration of the worker rights situation in that country. The United States raised specific concerns with respect to anti-union violence, including a 1999 incident in which armed vigilantes threatened and kidnapped leaders of a banana workers' union who were protesting the illegal dismissal of 900 workers. Guatemala was asked to facilitate negotiations to reemploy the 900 fired workers and to commit to speedy and effective implementation of labor code requirements with respect to this case. Guatemala's government was also asked to work with the country's legislature to pass proposed revisions to the labor code, and to provide a commitment, over the longer-term, to continual improvements in law enforcement and judicial administration related to the protection of worker rights.

In their responses to U.S. concerns, Guatemala's Vice President, Minister of Labor, and other officials have demonstrated considerable good faith in seeking to improve the worker rights situation in their country. The United States welcomes the Ministry of Labor's efforts to date to facilitate a resolution to the situation arising from the 1999 incident involving banana workers. There is evidence of progress in prosecuting those responsible for violence against workers in that case. We also welcome efforts by the government to suspend operating licenses of companies which have violated labor code provisions. In addition, the Guatemalan executive branch has presented legislation to bring the country's labor laws into conformity with ILO recommendations.

It is on the basis of these actions and assurances that Guatemala has been designated at this time as a CBTPA Beneficiary Country.

Despite certain forthcoming actions and statements by Guatemalan officials, the United States remains deeply concerned that the overall worker rights environment in Guatemala represents a threat to those seeking to advance basic, internationally recognized rights for workers. Instances of anti-union violence, including occasional murders, persist. The widespread impunity for those who provoke and carry out such violence is a particularly severe concern.

Consequently, Guatemala's CBTPA beneficiary status will be reviewed in April 2001, with a focus on further improvements in the area of worker rights. This review will include the following objectives: a) an assessment that the Guatemalan executive branch is taking all actions within its authority to ensure the physical safety and human and civil rights of union leaders and the effective criminal prosecution of persons charged with provoking anti-union violence, including killings of union leaders; b) assurances that the Government of Guatemala is taking all steps within its power to provide for the re-employment of the 900 fired banana workers and settlement of related labor law violations; c) further progress towards enacting the new Labor Code; and d) further improvements in labor law enforcement and judicial administration related to the protection of labor rights.

As a further sign of the seriousness with which the United States views these issues, Ambassador Barshefsky is initiating immediately a review of Guatemala's eligibility as a beneficiary country under the Generalized System of Preferences (GSP). This unprecedented self-initiated review will also be concluded in April 2001, and will focus on the government's response to anti-union violence and other aspects of internationally recognized worker rights.

Worker Rights Monitoring in El Salvador, Honduras, and Nicaragua

Worker rights issues were also pursued in the context of the CBTPA eligibility review of El Salvador, Honduras, and Nicaragua. With respect to El Salvador, the United States raised concerns regarding the effect of certain privatization programs in restricting union activity, as well as excessive legal formalities applied to the establishment of trade unions. In Honduras, the United States focused on the government's efforts to revise the Honduran labor code to reflect
recommendations made by the International Labour Organization. In Nicaragua, the U.S. expressed particular concern with respect to anti-union activity at two apparel factories in the Las Mercedes Free Trade Zone, and successfully sought the government's assurances that workers at those factories would be informed of their rights under Nicaragua's Labor Code.

In each of these cases, the governments in question provided responses which were helpful in addressing U.S. concerns. Nonetheless, the Administration believes that worker rights practices in these countries should be subject to ongoing monitoring. This monitoring will focus on follow-through to the commitments made by these governments in the context of the CBTPA eligibility review. In addition, the United States will request bilateral consultations with each of the three governments to discuss worker rights concerns by June 30, 2001.

''Material taken from http://www.usleap.org/trade/CTPA10-03.html as well as

References

Economy of the Caribbean
United States federal trade legislation
United States–Caribbean relations